Waverly Township is the name of some places in the U.S. state of Michigan:

 Waverly Township, Cheboygan County, Michigan
 Waverly Township, Van Buren County, Michigan

See also

Waverly Township (disambiguation)

Michigan township disambiguation pages